The CM-21 is an armoured vehicle designed and manufactured by the Republic of China Armoured Vehicle Development Center, based on the United States' model M113 APC. The first prototype was manufactured in 1979, and the CM-21 officially entered service in 1982. 

The CM-21 is still in use today, with over 1,000 units manufactured and a number of different variants.

History
At the end of 1967, the United States and the Republic of China (Taiwan) signed the Third-Nation Overhaul Program and began to repair US military equipment in Vietnam until the end of the Vietnam War. This allowed the RoC to accumulate experiences in the overhauling, welding, parts manufacturing, vehicle assembly, and testing of the M113 APC. In 1975, The Combined Logistics Command carried out the "Wan Cheng Program" (萬乘計劃), to domestically produce three M113 hulls using the aluminum alloy plates produced by the Taiwan Aluminum Corporation (known today as the Chinese Steel Aluminum Corporation). 

The Wan Cheng 1 was an imitation of the M106 mortar carrier, but the 4.2 inch rifled mortar was replaced with a larger Type 63 120 mm smoothbore mortar, and this innovation later became the CM-22 howitzer carrier. The Wan Cheng 2 is an attempt to create a light tank by moving the engine to the rear and lowering the front half of the hull to accommodate a M24 turret while keeping the vehicle from being top-heavy. The Wan Cheng 3 had mounted a "Worker Bees IV MLRS" (工蜂四型多管火箭), a Multiple Launch Rocket System (MLRS). The MLRS was later mounted on six more US made M113s. (An unrelated Wan Cheng 4 project involves one M48A1 tank re-fitted into a M48A5). 

The Wan Cheng Program provided a solid foundation for the design, manufacture and development of the CM-21 armoured vehicle.

Design
The standard version of CM-21 is an armoured personnel carrier (APC) that can carry up to 12 soldiers. It is largely the same as the basic M113 and inherits the same engine and transmission from the source design, but the welded aluminum alloy hull armour is further augmented with spaced armour at the front and the sides, the cavity within the spaced armour being filled with polyurethane to absorb the energy of incoming projectiles. 

Overall, the CM-21 is better protected than the M113, but the CM-21 is  heavier than the M113 and has slightly inferior mobility.

There are two firing ports on each side of the hull and one at the rear. Therefore, soldiers are sitting face to face in the front of the passenger compartment, and back to back in the rear. There are two water pumps that are switched on to lower the front flap. It is propelled by its tracks while in water.

Just like the M113, the CM-21 can also have external fuel tanks mounted on the rear. The basic armament of the CM-21 is one M2 Browning machine gun or an Mk 19 automatic grenade launcher, and a quad-mounted smoke grenade launcher on both sides of the front.

A CM-21 is able carrying an M2 and an Mk 19 at the same time by using a bi-mounted gun rack.

Variants

CM-21

CM-21A1
The CM-21 models currently in service are CM-21A1. The CM-21 is still a basic Armoured Personnel Carrier, and it cannot be upgraded to the CM-21A2 Infantry Fighting Vehicle. Also, with the introduction of CM-32 wheeled Armoured Vehicle, it is more unlikely that the CM-21A1 will receive an upgrade.

CM-21A2
CM-21A2 is a modified version of CM-21A1, inspired by the American M1132A2. The engine's intake has been modified to take air from the inside of the vehicle, rather than using exhausted gas, which reduces the crew's performance in combat. The side armour is also replaced with a net armour to protect the vehicle from anti tank weapons with shaped charges.

CM-21A2 is predicted to be upgraded directly into an infantry fighting vehicle, and was tested with a French GIAT Dragar 25 mm gun turret, but it was not accepted; a simple command turret was also added for the testing.

CM-22 Mortar Carrier
CM-22 is a variant of CM-21 with a 107/ 120 mm mortar, very similar to the American M106 mortar carrier. CM-22 was developed in 1987 and was still in production in 1999, but the ammo rack is different with an M106 in the late version of CM-22, along with parts from CM-21 such as headlights.

The passenger compartment is modified to carry mortar, and cancelled firing ports and spaced armour. The exterior of the CM-22 is basically the same as M106.

CM-23 Mortar Carrier
CM-23 is a variant of the CM-22 with an 81 mm mortar, identical to the American M125.

CM-25 TOW Launcher
CM-25 is a variant of the CM-21 which has the capability of firing TOW missiles, in order to engage armoured targets. The CM-25 has a modified passenger compartment to store TOW missiles, and has replaced the quad-mounted smoke grenade launcher with triple mounted ones. It also cancelled the firing ports and extended the spaced armour, but the protection of the CM-25 is not any stronger. The CM-25 is only operated by the Republic of China Marine Corps, while the Republic of China Army is still operating M113A1 TOW Launcher. The spaced armour of CM-25 is filled with polystyrene to increase buoyancy for the Marine Corps' amphibious operations.

CM-26 Command Track
CM-26 is a command track derived from the CM-22, and it is similar to the American M577.

See also

Design Timeline
CM-11 TankCM-12 TankCM-21 Armoured VehicleCM-24 Ammo CarrierCM-31CM-32 Armoured Vehicle

References

Armoured fighting vehicles of the Republic of China
Tracked armoured fighting vehicles